Harry Edward Cooksley (born 15 November 1994) is an English professional footballer who plays as a midfielder for Hartley Wintney.

Cooksley previously played for Limestone College in NCAA Division II, St. John's University in NCAA Division 1 as well as senior football for Aldershot Town, AFC Wimbledon and Farnborough.

Career
Cooksley joined the Academy of Football League Championship side Reading at the age of eight and progressed through the youth system of The Royals up until his release at the age of sixteen, at which point he joined the Academy of Queens Park Rangers. Following his release from QPR in January 2012, he joined the Academy of Football League One side Brentford on trial, but was ultimately unsuccessful in his pursuit to earn a contract with The Bees. However, on 10 August 2012, he was able to sign his first professional contract with Football League Two side Aldershot Town on a one–year deal.

The 17–year–old midfielder made his league debut for Aldershot Town on 18 August 2012 in a 2–0 victory over Plymouth Argyle as an injury time substitute for Josh Payne, in what would prove to be his first and last appearance for the club. Aldershot Town struggled throughout the season and were eventually relegated to the Conference National after finishing 24th in the league. On 1 May 2013 it was revealed that the club had failed to pay players their wages for the previous month. On 2 May 2013 Aldershot entered administration. On 16 May 2013, the administrators of Aldershot Town, Quantuma Restructuring, were forced to make 13 players redundant. Thus with the club in a state of financial turmoil and the possibility of a new contract rendered unfeasible, Cooksley left Aldershot Town.

The 18–year–old midfielder subsequently joined League Two side AFC Wimbledon on trial, making his first appearance for the Development squad in a 2–1 win over Portsmouth on 13 August 2013. On 19 September 2013 it was announced that Cooksley had signed a professional one–year contract with The Dons after impressing during his month on trial.

After four years playing college soccer in America, Cooksley signed for Segunda División B side Mallorca. Cooksley made three appearances for the club's B team in the Tercera División during his time with the club.

In January 2019, Cooksley joined Southern League Premier Division South club Farnborough and was subsequently sent out on a short-term loan deal to Combined Counties Premier Division side Badshot Lea. He returned to his parent club a month later and went on to make 12 appearances, scoring once.

In July 2019, Cooksley joined Austrian Regionalliga club Pinzgau Saalfelden. In December 2020 was released by Austrian side Pinzgau.

On 6 June 2021, it was announced that Cooksley would return to Farnborough ahead of the 2021–22 campaign. Cooksley later joined league rivals, Hartley Wintney in January 2022 on loan. On 29 May 2022, it was announced that Cooksley would leave the club at the end of his contract in June.

On 11 June 2022, Cooksley agreed to return to Hartley Wintney following his release from Farnborough. Upon his arrival he was appointed club captain.

Career statistics

References

External links

1994 births
Living people
Sportspeople from Guildford
English footballers
Association football midfielders
English Football League players
Reading F.C. players
Queens Park Rangers F.C. players
Aldershot Town F.C. players
AFC Wimbledon players
RCD Mallorca B players
Farnborough F.C. players
Badshot Lea F.C. players
Hartley Wintney F.C. players
Limestone Saints men's soccer players
St. John's Red Storm men's soccer players
Footballers from Surrey
English expatriate sportspeople in the United States
English expatriate sportspeople in Spain
English expatriate sportspeople in Austria